George Shingler (15 May 1882 – 5 May 1946) was an English cricketer. Shingler was a right-handed batsman whose bowling style is unknown. He was born in Leicester, Leicestershire.

Shingler made his first-class debut for Leicestershire against Lancashire in the 1920 County Championship at Aylestone Road, Leicester. He made three further first-class appearances for the county, the last of which came against Glamorgan in the 1921 County Championship. In his four first-class matches, he scored a total of 76 runs at an average of 9.50, with a high score of 26.

He died at Queniborough, Leicestershire on 5 May 1946.

References

External links
George Shingler at ESPNcricinfo
George Shingler at CricketArchive

1882 births
1946 deaths
Cricketers from Leicester
English cricketers
Leicestershire cricketers